Goodenia lamprosperma  is a species of flowering plant in the family Goodeniaceae and is endemic to northern Australia. It is an annual or perennial herb with linear to lance-shaped leaves sometimes with teeth on the edges, and racemes of yellow flowers.

Description

Taxonomy and naming
Goodenia lamprosperma was first formally described in 1859 by Ferdinand von Mueller in Fragmenta Phytographiae Australiae. The specific epithet (lamprosperma) means "shining-seeded".

Distribution and habitat
This goodenia grows in seasonally wet places, in swamps and near watercourses in north-western Western Australia, the Northern Territory and Queensland.

Conservation status
Goodenia lamprosperma is classified as "not threatened" by the Government of Western Australia Department of Parks and Wildlife and as of "least concern" under the Queensland Government Nature Conservation Act 1992 and the Northern Territory Government Territory Parks and Wildlife Conservation Act 1976.

References

lamprosperma
Eudicots of Western Australia
Flora of the Northern Territory
Flora of Queensland
Plants described in 1859
Taxa named by Ferdinand von Mueller
Endemic flora of Western Australia